Philpstoun railway station was a railway station in the village of Philpstoun, to the east of Linlithgow in West Lothian, Scotland. It was located on the Edinburgh and Glasgow Railway.

History 

Philpstoun station was opened by the Edinburgh and Glasgow Railway on 21 February 1842. It was closed on 18 June 1951  by British Railways.

The area around Philpstoun, in common with others in West Lothian, was an extremely busy centre for shale mining and petroleum manufacturing for almost a century, and this was reflected in the railways around Philpstoun. The station itself was situated in a deep cutting, and had two platforms. Immediately to the west, a facing junction, with crossovers and a looping facilities connected to a set of exchange sidings at Westfield, and these ran into Philpstoun No 1 shale mine. Extensive sidings connected within the facility, and a short branch ran just west of the (still extant) shale bings, crossing the canal, and continuing past Easter Pardovan in a southerly direction to serve a shale pit at Ochiltree (just north west of Threemiletown).  A tramway ran in the same direction on the eastern flank of the bings.
A trailing siding left the main up line near Pardovan, this was known as Pardovan siding and originally served a quarry.

Further west, a line branched from the down main via a trailing junction and ran adjacent to the mainline for some 500 yards before swinging south west, passing Champfleurie, before swinging south to serve oil works and a shale mine between Bridgend and Wester Ochiltree.

The course of these lines can be seen on Sheet 32 (Ordnance Survey Maps One-inch "Third" edition, Scotland, 1903–1912) on the National Library of Scotland digital library (Maps).

Services

References

Notes

Sources 
 
 
 
 North British Railway 1896 Western, Monkland and West Highland working timetable
 Philpstoun station on navigable OS map

Disused railway stations in West Lothian
Railway stations in Great Britain opened in 1842
Railway stations in Great Britain closed in 1951
Former North British Railway stations